Glass is a 1958 Dutch short documentary film by director and producer Bert Haanstra. The film won the Oscar for Documentary Short Subject in 1959. The film is about the glass industry in the Netherlands. It contrasts the handmade crystal from the Royal Leerdam Glass kaas Factory with automated bottle making machines. Short segments of artisans making various glass goods by hand are joined with those of mass production. It is often acclaimed to be the perfect short documentary.

References

External links

, posted by the Netherlands Institute for Sound and Vision
Glas on Aeon

1958 films
Best Documentary Short Subject Academy Award winners
1950s Dutch-language films
Dutch short documentary films
Films directed by Bert Haanstra
Glass production
1950s short documentary films
1958 documentary films